Nyai Gede Pinateh (fl. circa 1450–1500) was a Javanese merchant.  

Born Shishi Daniangzi (施氏大娘子), she was the eldest daughter of a non-Muslim Chinese business elite, Shi Jinqing, in Palembang. It is known that she adopted the name Nyai Gede Pinateh upon converting to Islam.

She was established herself as a merchant in Java. She is known as the adoptive foster mother of Sunan Giri. 
In this period, South East Asia was known for its women merchants, because commerce was mainly a small scale business included in the household chores and therefore regarded women's role, and there was no large scale merchant business with the exception of the trade between the Royal Houses and the foreign merchants.  She did, however, manage large scale merchant business, which was not common in Java except for royals or foreigners. She had the office of shahbander (master of the harbour) in Gresik on Java, and sent her merchant ships to Bali, Maluku and Cambodia.

References

15th-century businesspeople
16th-century businesspeople
16th-century businesswomen
Medieval businesswomen